Ara–Sasaram DEMU is a DEMU train belonging to East Central Railway zone that runs between  and  in India. It is currently being operated with 75271/75273/75272/75274 train numbers on a daily basis.

Service 
75271/75273/Ara–Sasaram DEMU has an average speed of 28 km/hr and covers 97 km in 3h 30m.
75272/75274/Sasaram–Ara DEMU has an average speed of 28 km/hr and covers 97 km in 3h 30m.

Route and halts
The important halts of the train are:

See also 
 Sasaram Junction railway station
 Ara Junction railway station

Notes

References

External links 
 75271/Ara–Sasaram DEMU
 75272/Sasaram–Ara DEMU
 75273/Ara–Sasaram DEMU
 75274/Sasaram–Ara DEMU

Rail transport in Bihar
Diesel–electric multiple units of India
Railway services introduced in 2017